The 1796–97 United States House of Representatives elections took place in the various states took place between August 12, 1796 (in North Carolina), and October 15, 1797 (in Tennessee). Each state set its own date for its elections to the House of Representatives. The size of the House increased to 106 seats after Tennessee became the 16th state to join the union. The first session of the 5th United States Congress was convened on May 15, 1797, at the proclamation of the new President of the United States, John Adams. Since Kentucky and Tennessee had not yet voted, they were unrepresented until the second session began on November 13, 1797.

Gains for the Federalist Party provided the president with a reliable majority in support of his policies. Many of the Federalist pick-ups in Congress came from the former Middle Colonies (New York, Pennsylvania, New Jersey, and Delaware). New England remained heavily Federalist, whereas the South and West favored Democratic-Republican candidates. Federalist trade and infrastructure policies found widespread approval in the Mid-Atlantic states during this era.  With the growth of cities in Maryland, Pennsylvania, and New York, government intervention in the interest of industrialization and mercantilism became more attractive to voting citizens in these areas.

During this period, each state fixed its own date for a congressional general election. Elections to a Congress took place both in the even-numbered year before and in the odd-numbered year when the Congress convened. In some states the congressional delegation was not elected until after the legal start of the Congress (on the 4th day of March in the odd-numbered year).

Election summaries 
During this period, each state fixed its own date for a congressional general election. Elections took place both in the even-numbered year before and in the odd-numbered year when a Congress convened. In some states, the congressional delegation was not elected until after the legal start of the Congress (on the 4th day of March in the odd-numbered year). The 1st session of the 5th Congress ran May 15 – July 10, 1797, before the states of Kentucky and Tennessee had their elections, causing those states to be unrepresented in the 1st session.

Special elections 

Elections are sorted by election date, then by district.

Fourth Congress 
There were special and late elections to the 4th Congress in 1796.

|-
! 
| Gabriel Duvall
|  | Democratic-Republican
| 1794 
|  | Incumbent resigned March 28, 1796, having been elected judge of the Supreme Court of Maryland.New member elected April 18, 1796.Democratic-Republican hold.New member was seated May 5, 1796.New member was later elected to the next term, see below.
| nowrap | 

|-
! 
| Benjamin Goodhue
|  | Federalist
| 1789
|  | Incumbent resigned sometime in June 1796 to become U.S. Senator.New member elected September 12, 1796.Federalist hold.New member was seated December 7, 1796.New member was later elected to the next term, see below.
| nowrap | 

|-
! 
| James Hillhouse
|  | Federalist
| 1790
|  | Incumbent resigned July 1, 1796 to become U.S. Senator.New member elected September 19, 1796.Federalist hold.New member was seated December 5, 1796.On the same day however, new member lost election to the next term, see below.
| nowrap | 

|-
! 
| Jeremiah Crabb
|  | Federalist
| 1794
|  | Incumbent resigned sometime in 1796.New member elected October 3, 1796.Federalist hold.New member was seated December 5, 1796.On the same ballot, new member elected to the next term, see below.
| nowrap | 

|-
! 
| Daniel Hiester
|  | Democratic-Republican
| 1788
|  | Incumbent resigned July 1, 1796.New member elected October 11, 1796.Federalist gain.New member was seated December 8, 1796.
| nowrap | 

|-
! 
| colspan=3 | None (District created)
|  | New state admitted June 1, 1796.New member elected October 15, 1796.Democratic-Republican gain.New member was seated December 5, 1796.
| nowrap | 

|-
! 
| Benjamin Bourne
|  | Federalist
| 1790 
|  | Incumbent resigned in 1796 to become a U.S. district judge.New member elected November 15, 1796.Federalist hold.New member was seated December 19, 1796.New member was also elected to the next term, see below.
| nowrap | 

|-
! 
| Theodore Sedgwick
|  | Federalist
| 1789
|  | Incumbent resigned sometime in June 1796, having been elected U.S. Senator.New member elected November 21, 1796.Democratic-Republican gain.New member was seated January 27, 1797.
| nowrap | |-
! 
| Absalom Tatom
|  | Democratic-Republican
| 1795
|  | Incumbent resigned June 1, 1796.New member elected November 28, 1796.Federalist gain.New member seated December 13, 1796.New member did not run for the next term.
| nowrap | 

|-
! 
| Uriah Tracy
|  | Federalist
| 1792
|  | Incumbent resigned October 13, 1796 to become U.S. Senator.New member elected December 5, 1796.Federalist hold.New member was seated January 3, 1797.New member had already been elected to the next term, see below.
| nowrap | 

|}

 Fifth Congress 
There were special and late elections to the 5th Congress in 1797.

|-
! 
| Daniel Buck
|  | Federalist
| 1795
|  | Incumbent re-elected, but declined to serve.New member elected May 23, 1797.Federalist hold.
| nowrap | 

|-
! 
| Theophilus Bradbury
|  | Federalist
| 1794–1795
|  | Incumbent resigned July 24, 1797.New member elected August 4, 1797.Federalist hold.New member was seated November 27, 1797.
| nowrap | 

|-
! 
| Jeremiah Smith
|  | Federalist
| 1794
|  | Incumbent resigned July 26, 1797.New member elected August 28, 1797.Federalist hold.New member was seated December 15, 1797.
| nowrap | |-
! 
| Elisha Potter
|  | Federalist
| 1796 
|  | Incumbent resigned sometime in 1797.New member elected August 29, 1797.Federalist hold.New member was seated November 13, 1797.
| nowrap | 

|-
! 
| William L. Smith
|  | Federalist
| 1788
|  | Incumbent resigned July 10, 1797.New member elected September 4–5, 1797.Federalist hold.New member was seated November 23, 1797.
| nowrap | 

|-
! 
| James Davenport
|  | Federalist
| 1796 
|  | Died August 3, 1797.New member elected September 18, 1797.Federalist hold.New member was seated November 13, 1797.
| nowrap | 

|-
! 
| Andrew Jackson
|  | Democratic-Republican
| 1797 
|  | Incumbent resigned sometime in September 1797 when elected U.S. Senator.New member elected September 26, 1797.Democratic-Republican hold.New member seated on November 23, 1797, despite being under the minimum age for service.
| nowrap | 

|-
! 
| George Ege
|  | Federalist
| 1796 
|  | Incumbent resigned sometime in October 1797.New member elected October 10, 1797.Democratic-Republican gain.New member was seated December 1, 1797.
| nowrap | 

|}

 Connecticut 

Connecticut elected its seven representatives at-large on a general ticket.

|-
! rowspan=7 | 
| Uriah Tracy
|  | Federalist
| 1792
| Incumbent re-elected.Winner declined to serve.
| rowspan=7 nowrap | 

|-
| Roger Griswold
|  | Federalist
| 1794
| Incumbent re-elected.

|-
| Joshua Coit
|  | Federalist
| 1792
| Incumbent re-elected.

|-
| Zephariah Swift
|  | Federalist
| 1792
| Incumbent re-elected.Winner declined to serve.

|-
| Nathaniel Smith
|  | Federalist
| 1795 
| Incumbent re-elected.

|-
| Chauncey Goodrich
|  | Federalist
| 1794
| Incumbent re-elected.

|-
| James Hillhouse
|  | Federalist
| 1790
|  | Incumbent resigned July 1, 1796.New member elected.Federalist hold.

|}

 Delaware 

|-
! 
| John Patten
|  | Democratic-Republican
| 1794
|  | Incumbent retired.New member elected.Federalist gain.
| nowrap | 

|}

 Georgia 

|-
! rowspan=2 | 
| Abraham Baldwin
|  | Democratic-Republican
| 1789
| Incumbent re-elected.
| rowspan=2 nowrap | 

|-
| John Milledge
|  | Democratic-Republican
| 1794
| Incumbent re-elected.

|}

 Kentucky 

|-
! 
| Christopher Greenup
|  | Democratic-Republican
| 1792
|  | Incumbent retired.New member elected.Democratic-Republican hold.
| nowrap | 

|-
! 
| Alexander D. Orr
|  | Democratic-Republican
| 1792
|  | Incumbent retired.New member elected.Democratic-Republican hold.
| nowrap | 

|}

 Maryland 

Two of the four Democratic-Republicans were replaced by Federalists, bringing the Federalists from a 4–4 split to a 6-2 majority.

|-
! 
| George Dent
|  | Federalist
| 1792
| Incumbent re-elected.
| nowrap | 

|-
! 
| Richard Sprigg Jr.
|  | Democratic-Republican
| 1796 
| Incumbent re-elected.
| nowrap | 

|-
! 
| William Craik
|  | Federalist
| 1796 
| Incumbent re-elected.
| nowrap | 

|-
! 
| Thomas Sprigg
|  | Democratic-Republican
| 1792
|  | Incumbent retired.New member elected.Federalist gain.
| nowrap | 

|-
! 
| Samuel Smith
|  | Democratic-Republican
| 1792
| Incumbent re-elected.
| nowrap | 

|-
! 
| Gabriel Christie
|  | Democratic-Republican
| 1792
|  | Incumbent lost re-election.New member elected.Federalist gain.
| nowrap | 

|-
! 
| William Hindman
|  | Federalist
| 1792
| Incumbent re-elected.
| nowrap | 

|-
! 
| William V. Murray
|  | Federalist
| 1790
|  | Incumbent retired.New member elected.Federalist hold.
| nowrap | 

|}

 Massachusetts 

Massachusetts's electoral law required a majority for election, necessitating additional trials in three districts.

|-
! 
| colspan=3 | Vacant
|  | Incumbent representative-elect Theodore Sedgwick (Federalist) resigned sometime in June 1796 to become U.S. Senator.Democratic-Republican gain.New member also elected to finish the term on a later ballot, see above.
| nowrap | 

|-
! 
| William Lyman
|  | Democratic-Republican
| 1792
|  | Incumbent lost re-election.New member elected.Federalist gain.
| nowrap | |-
! 
| Samuel Lyman
|  | Federalist
| 1794
| Incumbent re-elected.
| nowrap | 

|-
! 
| Dwight Foster
|  | Federalist
| 1792
| Incumbent re-elected.
| nowrap | 

|-
! 
| Nathaniel Freeman
|  | Democratic-Republican
| 1794
| Incumbent re-elected.
| nowrap | 

|-
! 
| John Reed Sr.
|  | Federalist
| 1794
| Incumbent re-elected.
| nowrap | 

|-
! 
| George Leonard
|  | Federalist
| 17881794
|  | Incumbent retired.New member elected.Federalist hold.
| nowrap | |-
! 
| Fisher Ames
|  | Federalist
| 1788
|  | Incumbent retired.New member elected.Federalist hold.
| nowrap | 

|-
! 
| Joseph Varnum
|  | Democratic-Republican
| 1794
| Incumbent re-elected.
| nowrap | 

|-
! 
| Samuel Sewall
|  | Federalist
| 1796 
| Incumbent re-elected.
| nowrap | 

|-
! 
| Theophilus Bradbury
|  | Federalist
| 1794
| Incumbent re-elected.
| nowrap | 

|-
! 
| Henry Dearborn
|  | Democratic-Republican
| 1792
|  | Incumbent lost re-election.New member elected.Federalist gain.
| nowrap | |-
! 
| Peleg Wadsworth
|  | Federalist
| 1792
| Incumbent re-elected.
| nowrap | 

|-
! 
| George Thatcher
|  | Federalist
| 1788
| Incumbent re-elected.
| nowrap | 

|}

 New Hampshire 

In 1796, New Hampshire had a single at-large district with 4 seats.  Each voter cast 4 votes and a majority of voters (12.5% of votes) was required to be elected.  Since only three candidates received a majority, a run-off was held between the candidates in fourth and fifth place to fill the remaining seat.

|-
! rowspan=4 | 
| Jeremiah Smith
|  | Federalist
| 1790
| Incumbent re-elected.
| rowspan=4 nowrap | |-
| Nicholas Gilman
|  | Federalist
| 1788/89
|  | Incumbent retired.New member elected.Federalist hold.

|-
| John Samuel Sherburne
|  | Democratic-Republican
| 1792
|  | Incumbent retired.New member elected.Federalist gain.

|-
| Abiel Foster
|  | Federalist
| 1794
| Incumbent re-elected.

|}

 New Jersey 

|-
! rowspan=5 | 
| Jonathan Dayton
|  | Federalist
| 1791
| Incumbent re-elected.
| rowspan=5 nowrap | 

|-
| Mark Thomson
|  | Federalist
| 1794
| Incumbent re-elected.

|-
| Aaron Kitchell
|  | Federalist
| 1794 (special)
|  | Incumbent lost re-election.New member elected.Federalist hold.

|-
| Thomas Henderson
|  | Federalist
| 1794
|  | Incumbent lost re-election.New member elected.Federalist hold.

|-
| Isaac Smith
|  | Federalist
| 1794
|  | Incumbent retired.New member elected.Federalist hold.

|}

 New York 

|-
! 
| Jonathan Nicoll Havens
|  | Democratic-Republican
| 1794
| Incumbent re-elected.
| nowrap | 

|-
! 
| Edward Livingston
|  | Democratic-Republican
| 1794
| Incumbent re-elected.
| nowrap | 

|-
! 
| Philip Van Courtlandt
|  | Democratic-Republican
| 1793
| Incumbent re-elected.
| nowrap | 

|-
! 
| John Hathorn
|  | Democratic-Republican
| 1794
|  | Incumbent retired.New member elected.Democratic-Republican hold.
| nowrap | 

|-
! 
| Theodorus Bailey
|  | Democratic-Republican
| 1793
|  | Incumbent lost re-election.New member elected.Federalist gain.
| nowrap | 

|-
! 
| Ezekiel Gilbert
|  | Federalist
| 1793
|  | Incumbent retired.New member elected.Federalist hold.
| nowrap | 

|-
! 
| John E. Van Alen
|  | Federalist
| 1793
| Incumbent re-elected.
| nowrap | 

|-
! 
| Henry Glen
|  | Federalist
| 1793
| Incumbent re-elected.
| nowrap | 

|-
! 
| John Williams
|  | Democratic-Republican
| 1794
|  | Incumbent re-elected as a Federalist.Federalist gain.
| nowrap | 

|-
! 
| William Cooper
|  | Federalist
| 1794
|  | Incumbent lost re-election.New member elected.Federalist hold.
| nowrap | 

|}

 North Carolina 

|-
! 
| James Holland
|  | Democratic-Republican
| 1795
|  | Incumbent lost re-election.New member elected.Democratic-Republican hold.
| nowrap | 

|-
! 
| Matthew Locke
|  | Democratic-Republican
| 1793
| Incumbent re-elected.
| nowrap | 

|-
! 
| Jesse Franklin
|  | Democratic-Republican
| 1795
|  | Incumbent lost re-election.New member elected.Democratic-Republican hold.
| nowrap | 

|-
! 
| William F. Strudwick
|  | Federalist
| 1796 
|  | Incumbent retired.New member elected.Democratic-Republican gain.
| nowrap | 

|-
! 
| Nathaniel Macon
|  | Democratic-Republican
| 1791
| Incumbent re-elected.
| nowrap | 

|-
! 
| James Gillespie
|  | Democratic-Republican
| 1793
| Incumbent re-elected.
| nowrap | 

|-
! 
| William B. Grove
|  | Federalist
| 1791
| Incumbent re-elected.
| nowrap | 

|-
! 
| Dempsey Burges
|  | Democratic-Republican
| 1795
| Incumbent re-elected.
| nowrap | 

|-
! 
| Thomas Blount
|  | Democratic-Republican
| 1793
| Incumbent re-elected.
| nowrap | 

|-
! 
| Nathan Bryan
|  | Democratic-Republican
| 1795
| Incumbent re-elected.
| nowrap | 

|}

 Pennsylvania 

|-
! 
| John Swanwick
|  | Democratic-Republican
| 1794
| Incumbent re-elected.
| nowrap | 

|-
! 
| Frederick Muhlenberg
|  | Democratic-Republican
| 1788
|  | Incumbent retired.New member elected.Democratic-Republican hold.
| nowrap | 

|-
! 
| Richard Thomas
|  | Federalist
| 1794
| Incumbent re-elected.
| nowrap | 

|-
! rowspan=2 | 
| Samuel Sitgreaves
|  | Federalist
| 1794
| Incumbent re-elected.
| rowspan=2 nowrap | 

|-
| John Richards
|  | Democratic-Republican
| 1794
|  | Incumbent lost re-election.New member elected.Federalist gain.

|-
! 
| colspan=3 | Vacant
|  | Representative Daniel Hiester (Democratic-Republican) resigned July 1, 1796.New member elected.Federalist gain.Winner was also elected to finish the current term, see above.
| nowrap | 

|-
! 
| Samuel Maclay
|  | Democratic-Republican
| 1794
|  | Incumbent lost re-election.New member elected.Democratic-Republican hold.
| nowrap | 

|-
! 
| John W. Kittera
|  | Federalist
| 1791
| Incumbent re-elected.
| nowrap | 

|-
! 
| Thomas Hartley
|  | Federalist
| 1788
| Incumbent re-elected.
| nowrap | 

|-
! 
| Andrew Gregg
|  | Democratic-Republican
| 1791
| Incumbent re-elected.
| nowrap | 

|-
! 
| David Bard
|  | Democratic-Republican
| 1794
| Incumbent re-elected.
| nowrap | 

|-
! 
| William Findley
|  | Democratic-Republican
| 1791
| Incumbent re-elected.
| nowrap | 

|-
! 
| Albert Gallatin
|  | Democratic-Republican
| 1794
| Incumbent re-elected.
| nowrap | 

|}

 Rhode Island 

Rhode Island had an at-large district with two seats, each of which were elected separately.

|-
! 
| Benjamin Bourne
|  | Federalist
| 1790
| Incumbent re-elected.Winner later declined the seat.
| nowrap | 

|-
! 
| Francis Malbone
|  | Federalist
| 1792
|  | Incumbent retired.New member elected.Federalist hold.
| nowrap | 

|}

 South Carolina 

|-
! 
| William L. Smith
|  | Federalist
| 1788
| Incumbent re-elected.
| nowrap | 

|-
! 
| Wade Hampton
|  | Democratic-Republican
| 1794
|  | Incumbent retired.New member elected.Federalist gain.
| nowrap | 

|-
! 
| Lemuel Benton
|  | Democratic-Republican
| 1793
| Incumbent re-elected.
| nowrap | 

|-
! 
| Richard Winn
|  | Democratic-Republican
| 1793
|  | Incumbent lost re-election.New member elected.Democratic-Republican hold.
| nowrap | 

|-
! 
| Robert Goodloe Harper
|  | Federalist
| 1794
| Incumbent re-elected.
| nowrap | 

|-
! 
| Samuel Earle
|  | Democratic-Republican
| 1794
|  | Incumbent retired.New member elected.Democratic-Republican hold.
| nowrap | 

|}

 Tennessee 

|-
! 
| Andrew Jackson
|  | Democratic-Republican
| 1796
|  | Incumbent re-elected.Winner later resigned in September 1797 when elected U.S. senator.
| nowrap | 

|}

 Vermont 

Due to Vermont's law requiring a majority to secure a congressional seat, the 1st district required three ballots to choose a winner.

|-
! 
| Israel Smith
|  | Democratic-Republican
| 1791
|  | Incumbent lost re-election.New member elected.Democratic-Republican hold.
| nowrap | |-
! 
| Daniel Buck
|  | Federalist
| 1795
| Incumbent re-elected.Winner declined the seat.
| nowrap | 

|}

 Virginia 

|-
! 
| Robert Rutherford
|  | Democratic-Republican
| 1793
|  | Incumbent lost re-election.New member elected.Federalist gain.The election was unsuccessfully challenged by Rutherford.
| nowrap | 

|-
! 
| Andrew Moore
|  | Democratic-Republican
| 1789
|  | Incumbent retired.New member elected.Democratic-Republican hold.
| nowrap | 

|-
! 
| George Jackson
|  | Democratic-Republican
| 1795
|  | Incumbent lost re-election.New member elected.Federalist gain.
| nowrap | 

|-
! 
| Francis Preston
|  | Democratic-Republican
| 1793
|  | Incumbent retired.New member elected.Democratic-Republican hold.
| nowrap | 

|-
! 
| George Hancock
|  | Federalist
| 1793
|  | Incumbent retired.New member elected.Democratic-Republican gain.
| nowrap | 

|-
! 
| Isaac Coles
|  | Democratic-Republican
| 1793
|  | Incumbent retired.New member elected.Democratic-Republican hold.
| nowrap | 

|-
! 
| Abraham B. Venable
|  | Democratic-Republican
| 1790
| Incumbent re-elected.
| nowrap | 

|-
! 
| Thomas Claiborne
|  | Democratic-Republican
| 1793
| Incumbent re-elected.
| nowrap | 

|-
! 
| William B. Giles
|  | Democratic-Republican
| 1790
| Incumbent re-elected.
| nowrap | 

|-
! 
| Carter B. Harrison
|  | Democratic-Republican
| 1793
| Incumbent re-elected.
| nowrap | 

|-
! 
| Josiah Parker
|  | Federalist
| 1789
| Incumbent re-elected.
| nowrap | 

|-
! 
| John Page
|  | Democratic-Republican
| 1789
|  | Incumbent lost re-election.New member elected.Federalist gain'''.
| nowrap | 

|-
! 
| John Clopton
|  | Democratic-Republican
| 1795
| Incumbent re-elected.
| nowrap | 

|-
! 
| Samuel J. Cabell
|  | Democratic-Republican
| 1795
| Incumbent re-elected.
| nowrap | 

|-
! 
| James Madison Jr.
|  | Democratic-Republican
| 1789
|  | Incumbent retired.New member elected.Democratic-Republican hold.
| nowrap | 

|-
! 
| Anthony New
|  | Democratic-Republican
| 1793
| Incumbent re-elected.
| nowrap | 

|-
! 
| Richard Brent
|  | Democratic-Republican
| 1795
| Incumbent re-elected.
| nowrap | 

|-
! 
| John Nicholas
|  | Democratic-Republican
| 1793
| Incumbent re-elected.
| nowrap | 

|-
! 
| John Heath
|  | Democratic-Republican
| 1793
|  | Incumbent retired.New member elected.Democratic-Republican hold.
| nowrap | 

|}

See also 
 1796 United States elections
 List of United States House of Representatives elections (1789–1822)
 1796–97 United States Senate elections
 1796 United States presidential election
 4th United States Congress
 5th United States Congress

Notes

References

Bibliography

External links 
 Office of the Historian (Office of Art & Archives, Office of the Clerk, U.S. House of Representatives)